Ivanov Mys is the name of several rural localities in Russia:
Ivanov Mys, Irkutsk Oblast, a village in Tayshetsky District of Irkutsk Oblast
Ivanov Mys, Omsk Oblast, a selo in Ivanovo-Myssky Rural Okrug of Tevrizsky District of Omsk Oblast